Elections to the Baseball Hall of Fame for 1984 followed the system in place since 1978.
The Baseball Writers' Association of America (BBWAA) voted by mail to select from recent major league players and elected three: Luis Aparicio, Don Drysdale, and Harmon Killebrew. The Veterans Committee met in closed sessions to consider older major league players as well as managers, umpires, executives, and figures from the Negro leagues. It selected two players, Rick Ferrell and Pee Wee Reese. A formal induction ceremony was held in Cooperstown, New York, on August 12, 1984.

BBWAA election 

The BBWAA was authorized to elect players active in 1964 or later, but not after 1978; the ballot included candidates from the 1983 ballot who received at least 5% of the vote but were not elected, along with selected players, chosen by a screening committee, whose last appearance was in 1978. All 10-year members of the BBWAA were eligible to vote.

Voters were instructed to cast votes for up to 10 candidates; any candidate receiving votes on at least 75% of the ballots would be honored with induction to the Hall. The ballot consisted of 29 players; a total of 403 ballots were cast, with 303 votes required for election. A total of 2,905 individual votes were cast, an average of 7.21 per ballot. Those candidates receiving less than 5% of the vote will not appear on future BBWAA ballots, but may eventually be considered by the Veterans Committee.

Candidates who were eligible for the first time are indicated here with a dagger (†). The candidates who received at least 75% of the vote and were elected are indicated in bold italics; candidates who have since been elected in subsequent elections are indicated in italics. The candidates who received less than 5% of the vote, thus becoming ineligible for future BBWAA consideration, are indicated with an asterisk (*).

The newly-eligible players included 12 All-Stars, five of whom were not included on the ballot, representing a total of 25 All-Star selections. Jim Fregosi, who was selected to the All Star Game six times, was the only newly eligible player selected at least five times.

Players eligible for the first time who were not included on the ballot were: Sandy Alomar Sr., Andy Etchebarren, Al Fitzmorris, Tito Fuentes, Wayne Garrett, Cito Gaston, Larry Haney, Ed Herrmann, Joe Lahoud, Paul Lindblad, Dave May, Marty Perez, Bill Plummer, and Gary Sutherland.

J. G. Taylor Spink Award 
Ken Smith (1902–1991) received the J. G. Taylor Spink Award honoring a baseball writer. The award was voted at the December 1983 meeting of the BBWAA, and included in the summer 1984 ceremonies.

References

External links 
 1984 Election at www.baseballhalloffame.org

Baseball Hall of Fame balloting
Hall of Fame balloting